Love on the Run is a 1979 French comedy-drama film directed by François Truffaut, his fifth and final film about the character Antoine Doinel. Told in non-linear fashion, with frequent flashbacks to the four previous films, it stars Jean-Pierre Léaud, Claude Jade, Marie-France Pisier, Dorothée, and Dani. It was entered into the 29th Berlin International Film Festival.

Plot
After they kissed at the end of the previous film, Bed and Board, Antoine and his wife Christine were reconciled. But his affections keep wandering and, on a summer holiday, she finds him in bed with her friend Liliane. They divorce by mutual consent, sharing custody of their son Alphonse, and the autobiographical novel he has been writing for years is at last published. 

In a phone booth he finds a torn-up photograph of Sabine, a pretty girl who looks quite like Christine, and decides to track her down. Eventually spotting her in a record shop, they start an affair. But, as with Christine, there are upsets and separations. At his work he is traced by Lucien, a lover of his mother, who takes him to her grave, which Antoine had never looked for. 

At a railway station he sees Colette, his first love, who is now an advocate travelling to a court case, He jumps on her train, and they talk over old times, She has read his book, but soon becomes annoyed by his lack of veracity or interest in her life, and as they part Antoine accidentally drops the photo, . 

When she arrives back in Paris, Collette decides to return Sabine's photograph to her, and while on the stairs to Sabine's apartment she meets Christine. The two discuss not just Antoine, but their lives and children. Colette's son has died in an accident, she then divorced, but now hopes to form a permanent relationship with book store owner Xavier. Collette is delighted to learn that Xavier is the brother of Sabine. The film ends with Antoine being taken back by Sabine.

Reception
The film holds a rating of 58% on Rotten Tomatoes.

The New York Times placed the film on its Best 1000 Movies Ever list.

Cast
 Jean-Pierre Léaud as Antoine Doinel
 Claude Jade as Christine Doinel
 Marie-France Pisier as Colette
 Dorothée as Sabine Barnerias
 Dani as Liliane
 Daniel Mesguich as Xavier Barnerias
 Julien Bertheau as Monsieur Lucien
 Jean-Pierre Ducos as Christine's lawyer
 Marie Henriau as the Judge
 Rosy Varte as Colette's mother
 Julien Dubois as Alphonse Doinel
 Pierre Dios as M. Renard
 Alain Ollivier as the judge in Aix
 Monique Dury as Mme. Ida
 Emmanuel Clot as the friend at the printing press

References

External links
 
 
Love on the Run an essay by Chris Fujiwara at the Criterion Collection

1979 films
Films set in Paris
1970s French-language films
1979 romantic drama films
Films directed by François Truffaut
Antoine Doinel
Films with screenplays by François Truffaut
Films scored by Georges Delerue
Films about divorce
French romantic drama films
1970s French films